The Dragon in the Sword is a novel by Michael Moorcock published in 1986.

Plot summary
The Dragon in the Sword is a novel in which the Eternal Champion fights against Chaos to preserve the Cosmic Balance.

Reception
Dave Langford reviewed The Dragon in the Sword for White Dwarf #94, and stated that "the pages turn painlessly. For Moorcock, presumably, this represents either a rest between more ambitious books or a quick fund-raiser to pay the rates".

Reviews
 Review by C. W. Sullivan, III (1986) in Fantasy Review, November 1986
 Review by Don D'Ammassa (1987) in Science Fiction Chronicle, #89 February 1987
 Review by Chris Barker (1987) in Vector 140
 Review by Terry Broome (1988) in Vector 142

References

1986 novels